William Edward Pretyman Tomline FRS (27 February 1787 – 28 May 1836) was an English Member of Parliament for several constituencies.

He was the son of George Pretyman Tomline, Bishop of Lincoln. He married Frances Amler, daughter and heiress of John of Ford Hall near Shrewsbury in 1811. The marriage produced two daughters and three sons, one of whom was Colonel George Tomline, also a Member of Parliament. On the death of his father, he inherited Riby Grove and property in Bacton, Suffolk.

He was born at Riby Grove in Lincolnshire, and educated at Westminster School and Trinity College, Cambridge. On 19 November 1812 Tomline was elected a Fellow of the Royal Society. He was MP for Christchurch from 1812 to 1818, Truro from 1818 to 1820 and 1826 to 1829, and Minehead from 1830 to 1831. He was appointed High Sheriff of Lincolnshire for 1824–25.

His London home was the John Nash-designed, 1 Carlton House Terrace. He died aged 49 in 1836.

References

External links 

 

1787 births
1836 deaths
Alumni of Trinity College, Cambridge
Members of the Parliament of the United Kingdom for constituencies in Cornwall
Members of the Parliament of the United Kingdom for English constituencies
Fellows of the Royal Society
UK MPs 1812–1818
UK MPs 1818–1820
UK MPs 1826–1830
UK MPs 1830–1831
High Sheriffs of Lincolnshire